Aziak Island (also called Azki, Azlak, Azik, and Azaik) is a small island in the Andreanof Islands group in the Aleutian Islands of southwestern Alaska. This practice apparently became rarer as the twentieth century progressed and today Aziak is used almost exclusively to refer the Andreanof-group island. Very little is known about the island and it is uninhabited.

References

Andreanof Islands
Uninhabited islands of Alaska
Islands of Alaska
Islands of Unorganized Borough, Alaska